Banksia dallanneyi, commonly known as couch honeypot, is a species of prostrate shrub that is endemic to Western Australia. It only has a short above-ground stem, pinnatipartite or pinnatisect leaves, between thirty and seventy variously coloured flowers and glabrous, egg-shaped fruit.

Description
There are between ten and eighty triangular to oblong lobes on each side of the leaves and the lower surface is covered with woolly white hairs.

Taxonomy and naming
Couch honeypot was first formally described in 1845 by Carl Meissner as Dryandra lindleyana, published in Lehmann's Plantae Preissianae.

In 1996, Alex George described five subspecies, one subspecies with two varieties:
 Dryandra lindleyana subsp. sylvestris with oblong or linear leaf lobes;
 Dryandra lindleyana subsp. media with asymmetrical leaf lobes, the lower margin shallowly S-shaped or dished;

In 2007, Austin Mast and Kevin Thiele transferred all Dryandra species to Banksia. As there was already a species named Banksia lindleyana (porcupine banksia), Mast and Thiele changed the specific epithet to "dallanneyi", an anagram of "lindleyana".

The changed names of the subspecies and varieties are as follows and are accepted at the Australian Plant Census:
 Banksia dallanneyi subsp. agricola;
 Banksia dallanneyi subsp. dallanneyi;
 Banksia dallanneyi var. dallanneyi;
 Banksia dallanneyi var. mellicula;
 Banksia dallanneyi subsp. media;
 Banksia dallanneyi subsp. pollosta;
 Banksia dallanneyi subsp. sylvestris;

Distribution and habitat
Banksia dallanneyi grows on flats and rises in a range of soil types between Geraldton and Albany.

Ecology
An assessment of the potential impact of climate change on this species found that its range is likely to contract by between 30% and 80% by 2080, depending on the severity of the change.

References

dallanneyi
Endemic flora of Southwest Australia
Eudicots of Western Australia
Plants described in 1845
Taxa named by Kevin Thiele